In particle physics, supersymmetry breaking is the process to obtain a seemingly non-supersymmetric physics from a supersymmetric theory which is a necessary step to reconcile supersymmetry with actual experiments. It is an example of spontaneous symmetry breaking. In supergravity, this results in a slightly modified counterpart of the Higgs mechanism where the gravitinos become massive.

Supersymmetry breaking occurs at supersymmetry breaking scale. The superpartners, whose mass would otherwise be equal to the mass of the regular particles in the absence of the SUSY breaking, become much heavier.

In the domain of applicability of stochastic differential equations including, e.g, classical physics, spontaneous supersymmetry breaking encompasses such nonlinear dynamical phenomena as chaos, turbulence, pink noise, etc.

Supersymmetry breaking scale
In particle physics, supersymmetry breaking scale is the energy scale where supersymmetry breaking takes place.

If supersymmetry fully solves the hierarchy problem, this scale should not be far from 1000 GeV, and therefore it should be accessible at the LHC and other future accelerators. This scenario is called low energy supersymmetry.

However, supersymmetry may also be broken at high energy scales. Finally, Nature does not have to be supersymmetric at any scale.

See also
 Soft SUSY breaking
 Timeline of the Big Bang
 Chronology of the universe
 Big Bang
 Supersymmetric theory of stochastic dynamics

Supersymmetric quantum field theory
Symmetry